Saint Nicholas is a legendary figure in European folklore based on Greek early Christian and bishop Nicholas of Myra, patron saint of children.

On Saint Nicholas Day, children wait for Saint Nicholas to come and put a present under their pillow or in a boot on their windowsill, provided that the children were good during the year. Children who behaved badly may expect to find a twig or a piece of coal under their pillows. In the Netherlands (see Sinterklaas), Dutch children put out a shoe filled with hay and a carrot for Saint Nicholas' horse.

It is believed that Saint Nicholas arrives to celebrate his day, December 6 (December 19 according to the Julian calendar), and leaves before Christmas. This tradition is well known and celebrated in Austria, Croatia, the Czech Republic, Hungary, Poland, Romania, Slovakia, Slovenia, Ukraine (Sviatyi Mykolai), the Netherlands, Luxembourg, north-east France, western Germany, and Belgium.

Treats 

In the Austria, Czech Republic, Hungary, Slovenia, Slovakia and Ukraine, Saint Nicholas often comes with two assistants: a good angel who gives out presents to good children and a devil, who punishes bad children.

On Saint Nicholas Day, they come to the houses where small children live and give them some presents. While nice children receive various fruits, candies and toys, naughty children can expect nothing more than a wooden switch, several pieces of coal or carrot or potatoes left by a devil.

Treats are traditionally sweets, chocolate, candy and different nuts. In modern times, chocolate Saint Nicholas figures are most common. In Austria, Hungary and Romania, to get the presents, the boots must be polished, because Saint Nicholas does not fill boots that are not shiny enough.

Although presents are usually given to children by parents, it is not uncommon for adults to place small surprises (such as presents or a bunch of twigs) into the boots of others.

Virgács 

The virgács is a switch resembling a small broom, made with twigs or branches from a bush or willow tree, often painted gold.  They are sold on the streets in Hungary before Saint Nicholas Day.

See also

Christmas traditions
Santa Claus
Saint Nicholas

References

External links
Mikuláš in Prague (Czech Republic). Saint Nicholas Day (Mikuláš) by www.myczechrepublic.com

Saint Nicholas
Hungarian folklore
Slovak folklore
Slovenian folklore
Czech folklore
Ukrainian folklore
Christmas characters